Otokutu is a town in the Ughelli South Local Government Area of Delta State, Nigeria. It is accessible through the steel complex accessway Delta State.

See also
Asaba, Delta
Ughelli South

References

Where is Otokutu located - GoMapper

Further reading
Letters from Nigeria, D.W. Carnegie, Biblio-Bazaar 

Populated places in Delta State